Aquilegia flavescens, the yellow columbine, is a wildflower native to mountain meadows, open woods, and alpine slopes of the Rocky Mountains from Utah north to British Columbia and Alberta.

The plant grows to 20–70 cm in height. While the most common flower color is yellow, portions of the flowers can also be yellow-pink, raspberry pink, white, and cream.

External links
US Forest Service

flavescens
Alpine flora
Flora of the Rocky Mountains
Flora of the Northwestern United States
Flora of Western Canada
Flora of Colorado
Flora of Utah
Flora of Idaho
Flora without expected TNC conservation status